Owen David Warner (born 8 June 1999) is an English actor. He is known for portraying the role of Romeo Nightingale in the Channel 4 soap opera Hollyoaks. For his portrayal of Romeo, Warner won the Digital Spy Reader Award for Best Soap Newcomer in 2018.

In November 2022, Warner appeared as a contestant on the 22nd UK series of I'm a Celebrity...Get Me Out of Here! finishing in second place.

Early life
Warner was born on 8 June 1999 in Leicester, Leicestershire and attended Gartree High School before going on to study performing arts at SMB College Group's Melton Campus, formerly Brooksby Melton College, completing his studies in July 2017. He has two older brothers. Warner further studied acting at the Actors Workshop Nottingham. He later returned to the city to raise money for the Nottingham-based charity Footprints Conductive Education Centre, where he participated in a charity football match.

Career
Warner made his acting debut as Trev in the short film Beverley in 2015. In July 2018, he appeared as Raver in the short film 20th Century Tribe. 

Warner then joined the cast of the Channel 4 soap opera Hollyoaks. His character, Romeo Nightingale, was introduced as the long-lost son of established character James (Gregory Finnegan), arriving alongside his mother Donna-Marie Quinn (Lucy-Jo Hudson). His storylines on the show have included building a relationship with his father and has seen the introduction of the character's sister Juliet Nightingale (Niamh Blackshaw).

For his portrayal of the character, Warner won the award for Best Soap Newcomer at the 2018 Digital Spy Reader Awards. Warner has also made guest appearances on I'm a Celebrity: Extra Camp and Eating with My Ex, in support of his friend and Hollyoaks co-star Malique Thompson-Dwyer.

In November 2022, Warner appeared as a contestant on the 22nd series of the British reality television show I'm a Celebrity... Get Me Out of Here! and finished as a runner up in second place.

Personal life
Warner was in a relationship with his co-star Stephanie Davis between 2018 and 2019 and was later linked with Geordie Shore star Chloe Ferry and The Apprentice runner-up Camilla Ainsworth.

Filmography

Awards and nominations

References

External links
 

1999 births
21st-century English actors
Living people
English child actors
English male soap opera actors
English television actors
I'm a Celebrity...Get Me Out of Here! (British TV series) participants
Male actors from Leicestershire
People from Leicester